1978–79 was the 32nd season of the Western International Hockey League.

The schedule included playing games against University of British Columbia, University of Calgary, and the Spokane Flyers and Phoenix Roadrunners of the Pacific Hockey League.

The Nelson Maple Leafs suspended operations on December 21, 1978.
The Calgary Stampeders suspended operations on January 7, 1979.

Standings
 Kimberley Dynamiters	51		37	12	 2				321	211		 76
 Trail Smoke Eaters	54		23	28	 1				243	147		 49
 Cranbrook Royals	52		22	29	 1				259	259		 45
 Calgary Stampeders	25		12	11	 2				117	122		 26
 Nelson Maple Leafs 	22		 5	17	 0				 82	155		 10

Playoffs

Semi final
In a "best of 5" series, the Trail Smoke Eaters defeated Cranbrook Royals 3 games to 0 (5-3, 8-2, 4-3 OT)

Final
In a "best of 7" series, the Trail Smoke Eaters defeated Kimberley Dynamiters 4 games to 3 (5-6 2OT, X-X, 2-8, 8-4, X-X, 4-3 2OT, 6-2).

The Trail Smoke Eaters advanced to the 1978-79 Western Canada Allan Cup Playoffs.

References 

Western International Hockey League seasons
WIHL